Thomas Smith (October 30, 1931 – May 17, 2022) was an American sports shooter. He competed in the 50 metre pistol event at the 1964 Summer Olympics.

References

External links
 

1931 births
2022 deaths
American male sport shooters
Olympic shooters of the United States
Shooters at the 1964 Summer Olympics
People from Sabinal, Texas
Sportspeople from Texas
Pan American Games medalists in shooting
Pan American Games gold medalists for the United States
Shooters at the 1963 Pan American Games
Medalists at the 1963 Pan American Games